Catalina elegans is a species of rove beetles in the subfamily Aleocharinae. It has an Afrotropical distribution.

References

External links 

 Catalina elegans at fieldmuseum.org

Aleocharinae
Beetles described in 1967